Advanced Science is an interdisciplinary open access journal covering fundamental and applied research in materials science, physics and chemistry, medical and life sciences, as well as engineering. It is published by Wiley-VCH and the editor-in-chief is Kirsten Severing.

Abstracting and indexing

The journal is abstracted and indexed in:
Chemical Abstracts Service 
Current Contents/Physical, Chemical & Earth Sciences 
Science Citation Index Expanded
According to the Journal Citation Reports, the journal has a 2021 impact factor of 17.521.

References

External links
 

Multidisciplinary academic journals
Wiley-VCH academic journals
Biweekly journals
English-language journals

Publications established in 2014